Songs of Love may refer to:

 Songs of Love (Anita Ward album)
 Songs of Love (Mark Eitzel album)
 Songs of Love (Simply Red album)
 Songs of Love, a 2003 compilation album by Sting
 "Songs of Love", a track on Casanova by The Divine Comedy, also used as the theme music for comedy series Father Ted